See German tanker Altmark for the ship named after Altmark and Stary Targ for the Polish village named Altmark in German.

The  (English: Old March) is a historic region in Germany, comprising the northern third of Saxony-Anhalt. As the initial territory of the March of Brandenburg, it is sometimes referred to as the "Cradle of Prussia", as by Otto von Bismarck, a native from Schönhausen near Stendal.

Geography 

The Altmark is located west of the Elbe river between the cities of Hamburg and Magdeburg, mostly included in the  districts of Altmarkkreis Salzwedel and Stendal. In the west, the Drawehn hill range and the Drömling depression separate it from the Lüneburg Heath in Lower Saxony; the Altmark also borders the Wendland region in the north and the Magdeburg Börde in the south. Adjacent east of the Elbe is the historical Prignitz region.

The population is small. The cultural landscape within the North European Plain is rural and widely covered with forests and heathlands. The largest towns are Stendal, with a population of 39,000, and Salzwedel (21,500).

History 
Before the Migration Period of 300 to 700 AD, the Lombards had settled the future Altmark. Subsequently, Old Germanic Saxon tribes lived in the northwest and Polabian Slavs in the eastern territories along the Elbe. After the Saxon Wars, waged by Charlemagne from 772 to 804, the lands became part of the Carolingian Empire. They formed part of the Eastphalian territory of the Duchy of Saxony, which, from 843 onwards, constituted the eastern borderlands of East Francia under Louis the German. The bishops of Verden and of Halberstadt promoted the Christianisation of the Saxon population.

In 936 the German king Otto I allotted the territory of the later Altmark to the Saxon Count Gero, in order to subdue the West Slavic Wends settling on the Elbe. Gero thereafter campaigned in the Slavic lands far beyond the river Elbe and thereafter established the Saxon  stretching up to the Oder in the east. Upon Gero's death in 965, his  was split and the Northern March was granted to Dietrich of Haldensleben, who nevertheless turned out to be an incapable ruler and lost all the territories east of the Elbe in the Slavic Lutici uprising of 983. He retained only his margravial title and the initial land basis of his predecessor Gero's conquests west of the river.

For over one and a half century, the lands east of the Elbe defied German control, until in 1134 Emperor Lothair of Supplinburg bestowed the Northern March on the Ascanian count Albert the Bear. Albert signed an inheritance contract with the Slavic Hevelli prince Pribislav and in 1150 succeeded him in his eastern territory around the fortress of Brandenburg an der Havel, which became the nucleus of his newly established Margraviate of Brandenburg in 1157. 

As part of Brandenburg, from 1415 held by the House of Hohenzollern, the Altmark became part of Brandenburg-Prussia and (from 1701) of the Kingdom of Prussia. After Prussia's defeat at the hands of Napoleon in 1806, the terms of the Treaty of Tilsit (1807) assigned the territory of the Altmark to the new Kingdom of Westphalia. Prussia regained the area upon Napoleon's defeat (per Article XXIII of the Final Act of the Congress of Vienna, 1815); however, it was incorporated into the new Prussian Province of Saxony rather than being attached to the Province of Brandenburg.

After World War II the Altmark, lying to the east of the inner German border, became part of the new state of Saxony-Anhalt in the Soviet occupation zone. The regional administration of East Germany saw it administered within  from 1952 to 1990. With German reunification in 1990, the Altmark became part of a reconstituted Saxony-Anhalt.

Rivers and lakes 

The region is drained by the Elbe, joined by the Havel at Havelberg, and its left tributaries of the Milde-Biese-Aland system and the Jeetzel river.

The largest natural lake of the Altmark is the Arendsee.

Transport

Road 
The Altmark is located off the main traffic routes. The Bundesautobahn 14 leads to the Bundesautobahn 2 from Hanover to Berlin, it however ends north of Magdeburg. A continuation through the Altmark towards Schwerin is planned. Beside which the Federal roads B71, B107, B188, B189, B190, B248 run through the region.

Rail 
Stendal station is a stop on the Hanover–Berlin high-speed railway. Other lines include:
 Stendal–Salzwedel–Uelzen
 Wittenberge–Salzwedel–Oebisfelde
 Magdeburg–Stendal–Wittenberge
 Bismark–Kalbe (Milde)
 Stendal–Tangermünde

Towns 

 Salzwedel
 Oebisfelde
 Arendsee
 Seehausen
 Diesdorf
 Beetzendorf
 Klötze
 Mieste
 Gardelegen
 Kalbe (Milde)
 Bismark
 Osterburg
 Stendal
 Havelberg
 Tangermünde
 Tangerhütte
 Uchtspringe

External links 

 Altmarkwiki, the regional wiki for the Altmark

Notes and references 

Margraviate of Brandenburg
Regions of Saxony-Anhalt
Former states and territories of Saxony-Anhalt
Historical regions in Germany